Mark Richard Erskine Easton (born 12 March 1959) is the Home Editor for BBC News broadcasting on national television and radio news. His writing and presenting credits include The Happiness Formula on BBC Two in 2006 and The Crime of Our Lives for BBC Radio 4 in 2007. His first book, Britain etc., was published in 2012. His second book Islands: Searching for truth on the shoreline was published in October 2022. 

He was previously social affairs editor at Channel 4 News and political editor at 5 News.

Early life

Mark Richard Erskine Easton was born on 12 March 1959 in Bearsden, near Glasgow. He moved with his parents from Scotland to Winchester at the age of ten.  He attended Peter Symonds Grammar School in Winchester.  He is the son of Stephen and Fiona Easton.

Career

Easton joined his local newspaper, the Southern Evening Echo, in 1979 having decided upon a career in journalism after winning a game of Waddington's "Scoop" aged 13. He worked at Radio Victory from 1980–1, at Radio Aire from 1981-2 and at LBC from 1982–6.

In 1986, Easton joined the BBC as a reporter on London Plus, BBC Breakfast News, Newsnight and Here and Now. In 1996, Easton joined the newly launched Channel Five as Political Editor for Five News. Easton then moved in 1998 to Channel 4 News as Home and Social Affairs Editor.

Since 2004 Easton has been the Home Editor of BBC News reporting across the Corporation's range of platforms.  As an editor, Easton appears mainly on the evening bulletins, BBC News at Six and BBC News at Ten, as well as BBC Radio 4 programmes including Today. Easton also maintains a blog on the BBC News website.

Personal life

Easton lives in Islington with his wife Antonia and four children.

References

External links
 BBC Biography

Video clips
 
 

1959 births
BBC newsreaders and journalists
British investigative journalists
Living people
Mass media people from Winchester
People educated at Peter Symonds College
Channel 4 people